Peter Webster Palmer (September 20, 1931 – September 21, 2021) was an American actor best known for his portrayal of Li'l Abner, alongside Edie Adams, both on Broadway and on film.

Life and career
Palmer was born on September 20, 1931, in Milwaukee, Wisconsin. He was offered scholarships to a number of universities; he chose the University of Illinois at Urbana-Champaign to study voice under Bruce Foote. He was the first music major to letter in football at the university. While at Illinois his team won the Big Ten championships in 1951 and 1953 and the Rose Bowl in 1952. Palmer sang the national anthem at every home game in 1953 before taking the field.

In 1956, Palmer was cast in the title role of the musical Li'l Abner, for which he won a Theatre World Award. Having won a singing contest while in the U.S. Army, he was rewarded with an appearance on The Ed Sullivan Show, where he sang "Granada". The producers of the musical, Melvin Frank and Norman Panama, happened to spot him on the Sullivan show and sought out to hire him immediately. In 1959, he was cast in the same role in the movie version. His Li'l Abner role brought him a guest appearance on The Ford Show (starring Tennessee Ernie Ford).

Palmer said that he tired of the Li'l Abner role after six months of the show's 22-month run. "It stamped me so definitely as a hillbilly type," he said, "that everything else I was offered afterward was in a similar vein". He tried to alter that image by singing in night clubs and making recordings of his singing in operettas.

In 1967, Palmer had a recurring role as Sergeant James Bustard, a former Confederate States of America soldier in the short-lived series Custer. Throughout the 1960s, 1970s, and 1980s, Palmer appeared on numerous television episodes, including small parts on Dallas, M*A*S*H, and Emergency! He appeared on Broadway with Carol Channing in Lorelei in 1974. In 1977, he had a regular role as part of the cast on the short-lived sitcom The Kallikaks, playing Oscar Heinz.

Personal life
In 1954, Palmer married his first wife, Jackalee Ann "Jackie" Gleason; they divorced in 1964. In 1966, he married Mary Lou "Aniko" Farrell; Palmer had six children, five with first wife, Jackie (Jack, Scott, Sherri, Mike, Kathy, and Steven). With his second wife, Aniko, he had a daughter, Farrell Beth Palmer.

Death
Palmer died in Tampa, Florida on September 21, 2021, the day after his 90th birthday.

Filmography

References

External links
 
 
 Peter Palmer: If I Had My Druthers... — interview at BroadwayWorld.com
 

1931 births
2021 deaths
Male actors from Milwaukee
American male musical theatre actors
American male television actors
University of Illinois at Urbana–Champaign School of Music alumni
Theatre World Award winners
20th-century American male actors
20th-century American singers
20th-century American male singers